USS LSM-46 was a  in the United States Navy during World War II.

Construction and career 
LSM-46 was laid down on 6 June 1944 at Brown Shipbuilding Co., Houston, Texas. Launched on 30 June 1944 and commissioned on 1 August 1944.

During World War II, LSM-46 was assigned to the Asiatic-Pacific theater. She took part in the Battle of Iwo Jima from 19 February to 26 March 1945. The ship carried supplies and marines to and back from the beach. Moreover, injured marines were brought on board to be transferred to hospital ship, USS Samaritan. On the evening of 23 February, while beached on Red beach, and while the 40 mil. gunners on her bow were exchanging fire with Japanese gunners in Mount. Suribachi, she was struck by a 105 mil. mortar shell at the forward 50 cal. machine gun on the port side. This shell killed two men instantly and wounded seventeen men, two dying later. Her starboard side was hit below the water line by a second 105 mil. mortar shell. There were no injuries from that hit. She received the Navy Unit Commendation for her actions at the Battle of Iwo Jima.

LSM-46 was decommissioned on 18 March 1946 at Norfolk Navy Yard, Portsmouth.

She was struck from the Navy Register on 12 April 1946.

The ship was later sold on 23 October 1948 as military surplus, to Charles N. Wilson for St. John Tugboat Company in East Saint John, New Brunswick, Canada. LSM-56, LSM-78 and LSM-89 were also sold to the same owner to be used as barges.

They were all put out of service in 1960 and sold for scrap. Halfway through the scrapping process, the ships were abandoned thus her together with LSM-56 remained at the Musquash Estuary. They are now part of the landscape and a point of interest. Another unidentified LSM is present in the middle of the river, capsized in place.

Awards 
LST-46 have earned the following awards:

American Campaign Medal
Navy Unit Commendation
Asiatic-Pacific Campaign Medal (1 battle star) 
Combat Action Ribbon 
World War II Victory Medal
[ Purple heart ]

External links 

Video of the abandoned LSM-46 and LSM-56

Citations

Sources 
 
 
 
 

World War II amphibious warfare vessels of the United States
Ships built in Houston
1944 ships
LSM-1-class landing ships medium